La Granja is a locality located in the Colón Department of the province of Córdoba.

References

Populated places in Córdoba Province, Argentina